The Tignish Aces (officially the Tignish Perry's Construction Aces) are a Canadian Junior C ice hockey team based in Tignish, Prince Edward Island. They play in the Prince Edward Island Junior C Hockey League. They play at the Credit Union Arena and are coached by Dwayne Handrahan.

History
The Aces were founded in 1997 as a member of the Prince Edward Island Minor Junior Hockey League. They won the league championship in their first season and again in 2003 and 2005. They have been historically the most successful team in the league, winning 10 championships.

Incident vs Sherwood
In March 2013, in the final game of the season, a brawl erupted when, as handshakes were taking place, three players from the Sherwood Falcons crossed centre ice and charged the Aces' players. The Aces had just won the game to advance to the league finals. Eight players and two coaches were suspended beginning the next season.

Season-by-season

Maritime-Hockey North Junior C Championship

See also

 List of ice hockey teams in Prince Edward Island

References

External links
PEI Junior C Website

2007 establishments in Prince Edward Island
Ice hockey teams in Prince Edward Island
Ice hockey clubs established in 2007